The 6th Macau International Movie Festival ceremony, organized by the Macau Film and Television Media Association and China International Cultural Communication Center, took place on November 30, 2014, in Macau. 

Coming Home won a record-tying four awards including Best Picture, Best Writing, Best Newcomer and Best Cinematography. Sara won two awards including Best Actor and Best Actress.

Winners and nominees

Extra Awards
Outstanding Film Award (优秀影片大奖)
Outstanding Children's Film Award (优秀儿童影片大奖)
Chinese Director Outstanding Contribution Award (华语导演杰出贡献奖)
Chinese Film Performance Outstanding Achievement Award (华语影视表演杰出成就奖)
Film Industry Development Contribution Award (电影产业发展贡献奖)
Action Performance Outstanding Achievement Award (动作表演杰出成就奖) 
Best Non-Profit Film (最佳公益影片大奖) 
Outstanding Producer Award (优秀制片人大奖)

References

External links

Golden Lotus Awards
Macau
2014 in Macau
Gold